The India–Pakistan football rivalry, between the India and Pakistan national football teams, is one of the international football rivalries in Asia, though not as competitive compared to other sports with more intense rivalries such as cricket and field hockey. Any sport involving these two sides, form one of the most intense sports rivalries in the world, especially cricket.

History
The tense relations between the two nations which emerged from bitter diplomatic relationships and conflict that originated during the Partition of British India into India and Pakistan in 1947, the Indo-Pakistani Wars, and the Kashmir conflict established the foundations for the emergence of an intense sporting rivalry between the two nations.

India faced Pakistan for the first time at the international stage in the last game of the 1952 Colombo Cup, the both sides settled for a goalless draw and emerged as joint winners of the tournament after finishing first and second respectively.

With the massive popularity for cricket in the subcontinent, football largely takes a backseat. However in the recent times, the football games between these two sides are viewed in large numbers, especially in 2014 when 85% of the tickets for a friendly match between India and Pakistan were sold out quickly at the Bangalore Football Stadium. This was first such friendly held since 2005.

Men's matches
As of 2 April 2022

Summary

Women's matches
As of 2 April 2022

Summary

Records and statistics

Men's

Most goals

Hat-tricks

Match records

Women's

Most goals

Hat-tricks

Match records

Honours

Men's

Women's

Players who have played for both teams
Prior to the Partition of India in 1947 India had played football, having first played as an international side in 1938. Following the Partition, Pakistan was created and began playing as an independent nation, making their debut in 1950.

The following players played for Pakistan after appearing for India, are:
Taj Mohammed – Represented India until 1948; and Pakistan after 1950
Sheikh Abdul Latif – Represented India until 1960; and Pakistan after 1962
Mohammed Rahmatullah – Represented India until 1961; and Pakistan after 1962

The following player played with India after appearing for Pakistan, is:
Balai Dey – Represented Pakistan until 1965; and India after 1969

See also
India–Pakistan sports rivalries
List of association football rivalries
Earth Derby
India–Pakistan cricket rivalry
India–Pakistan field hockey rivalry

References

 

India–Pakistan relations
India–Pakistan sports rivalries
International association football rivalries
India national football team
Pakistan national football team